Dibwangui Hydroelectric Power Station is a planned 15 megawatts hydroelectric power station in Gabon. The power station is under development by a consortium comprising (a) Eranove, a French independent power producer (IPP) and (b) Gabon Strategic Investment Fund (FGIS), a government-owned investment parastatal company. A long term power purchase agreement (PPA) was signed between the Gabonese authorities and 
Louetsi Energy, the special purpose vehicle (SPV) company which owns and is developing this power station.

Location
The power station is located across the Louetsié River, at the village of Mandji, in Ngounié Province, in southwestern Gabon.

Overview
Three Kaplan turbines, each rated at 5.1 MW are to be installed. The work includes the construction of an outdoor electrical substation at the power station. New overhead evacuation power lines will evacuate the power from Dibwangui to Bongolo. The electric substation at Bongolo will be expanded and remodeled to accommodate the incoming energy.

Ownership
The consortium that owns the power statin and is developing it, has formed an ad hoc company called Louetsi Energy, to own, design, fund, develop, construct, operate and maintain the renewable energy infrastructure. The table below illustrates the shareholding in the ad hoc company.

Other considerations
A study conducted to determine the sustainability of this power station evaluated the proposed power plant across "eleven environmental, social and governance (ESG) performance criteria". In a report made public in 2020, the power station "achieved global good practice in ESG assessment" and is "rated as an example of international good practice in sustainability design and planning".

See also

List of power stations in Gabon
Ngoulmendjim Hydrolectric Power Station

References

External links
 About Louetsi Energy

Power stations in Gabon
Ngounié Province
Hydroelectric power stations in Gabon
Proposed energy infrastructure
Dams in Gabon